Triple Play is a series of video games based on Major League Baseball, published by EA Sports until their replacement by the MVP Baseball in 2003.

GameSpot stated that other simulations (for example, Sega's version) were superior to Triple Play, while GamePro greeted it as "the best baseball simulation so far". Electronic Gaming Monthly editors named Triple Play Gold Edition a runner-up for Genesis Game of the Year (behind Vectorman 2).

Games

All of the games contained the rosters and schedules of the beginning of the season of the year before the one described in the name except for Triple Play 2002. For example, Triple Play 2001 contained the rosters and schedules of the 2000 season, and Triple Play Baseball (without a year) contained the rosters and schedules for 2001. This is a result of the tradition of listing the year the series ends in, basketball, football and hockey ending in a different year from when they started. Baseball is the only exception, as it begins in March and ends in October of the same year.

The games were produced primarily for the PlayStation console, but also saw release on the PC and the Game Boy Color.

See also
MVP Baseball (video game series)

References

Electronic Arts franchises
EA Sports games
Major League Baseball video games
Video game franchises
Video game franchises introduced in 1995